Red Rag: A Magazine of Women's Liberation was a British socialist feminist magazine published between 1972 and 1980.

History
The magazine was produced by a Marxist collective, not aligned to any political party. Though it originated among London members of the Communist Party of Great Britain (CPGB), the editors called for "total democracy" and involved feminist contributors from outside the party. This pluralism led to CPGB disquiet after the first issue appeared, and the party withdrew funding and expelled the magazine's editorial board. The magazine's editorial collective responded that "it's not yours to ban".

Red Rag, "lively and often irreverent", pressed for activism on a host of issues affecting women: 

Writers included Beatrix Campbell, Sue Slipman, Sheila Rowbotham, Audrey Wise, Rosalind Delmar and Selma James.

References

External links
 Red Rag: A Magazine of Women's Liberation (1973?-1980?), Grassroots Feminism

Defunct women's magazines published in the United Kingdom
Political magazines published in the United Kingdom
Feminism in the United Kingdom
Magazines established in 1972
Socialist magazines
Feminist magazines
Marxist magazines
Socialist feminism
Communist Party of Great Britain